The RÁBA Automotive Group,  commonly known as Rába, is a Hungarian public limited company, listed on the Budapest Stock Exchange. Rába engineers, manufactures and customizes automotive components, specialty vehicles and axles for commercial vehicles, agri-machinery and earth-movers. The Rába has been building axles as well as complete vehicles since 1902. The company has three strategic business units. The company is headquartered in Győr, employing more than 2000 people.

History

Establishment

1896. On March 27, a group of capitalists filed a petition with the City of Győr. In the application, they requested and were granted State benefits, duty exemptions and pre-orders. According to the share subscription form, the task of the factory is: " Factory production of wagons, machines and steam boilers, production of all kinds of electrical plants and equipment (…) ". The share capital of the company was HUF 500,000 (of which HUF 440,000 was owned by the Lederer brothers).With the inaugural general meeting held on December 28, 1896, the company at Győr "Magyar Waggon- és Gépgyár Részvénytársaság" officially started its operation. By 1900 the factory was a modern large-scale machine factory with an iron and steel foundry, material testing laboratories, and maintenance and tool-making workshops.

Products, technical development and economic achievements before the First World War

The first months of 1897 were marked by the start-up of the factory. The city of Győr handed over 15 acres of 720 squares to the factory for a symbolic amount of HUF 7,500. They started to convert the ox stalls into a factory building, ordered the technical equipment of the factory, and on February 22 the company was registered in the Győr court of registration. The plant's 500 workers received a total of 500 hp on three steam engine units. The value of the buildings was HUF 131,472, and HUF 48,779 was spent on the renovation. This allowed the company to become a very modern wagon factory. 
The main (almost exclusive) product of the post-factory period was the railway car. At first trucks and then cars were made 8-10 a day, which was outstanding with 1,200 workers in 1898. The first product was a 15-ton, 2-axle tanker for the Galician-Carpathian Petroleum Rt.

In 1898, orders were placed for the production of freight wagons (wine transport, charcoal transport, furniture transport, poultry transport, fruit transport) and passenger cars (guide wagons). Thus, by the end of the year, the factory had reached the production of the 1660th railway carriage.

In 1899, due to falling domestic orders, the factory looked to exports. We managed to win some Italian, German, and overseas orders. As more and more foreign cities order city trams (Amsterdam, Antwerp), it has become necessary to create an " electric accumulator manufacturing department ".

In 1900, the company was invited to the World's Fair in Paris along with several wagon factories, where the factory presented 4 wagons. In the meantime, they procured the equipment and raw materials needed for battery production.

The year 1901 was a big leap in the world. Customers now included the East India Railways, the Costa Rican Railways, the British Colonies in South Africa and the London Underground Railways. The successes were due to competitive prices, good quality products, and adherence to delivery deadlines. The battery manufacturing division was transformed into a separate company.

Already in 1902, the company dealt with the idea of road vehicle production, as the two orders suggest, but the actual production did not begin until 1903. The production of military vehicles at the wagon factory began in great secrecy. The company faced a big dilemma in choosing the production profile because it had to choose a vehicle that has a future. Since the old engine factories are still mainly engaged in the production of stationary engines, the management of the Wagon Factory purchased the patent for the Stoltz system gasoline engine. The car industry was still in its infancy, the biggest driving force was the sport. However, there were those interested in commercial vehicles such as the military and the post office. in Hungary János Csonka and Donát Bánki pioneered the production of motor vehicles. The Wagon Factory contacted János Csonka and entered the tender production of three-wheeled motor vehicles. 
In 1903, when the right to manufacture a steam boiler was purchased, they were thinking not only of the production of steam-powered railway carriages, but also of steam cars. However, the idea of a steam car was soon discarded, so another plan came up, one for a gasoline-powered commercial vehicle. With the start of car production, the factory's revenue became more even because it could also be produced for storage. The test drive of the first car made in Győr was made in 1904. was held on 25 February. Unlike France, like Germany, the company aimed to produce truck vehicles at a pace similar to that of passenger cars. On March 16, 1905, the first agricultural experimental tractor, actually for military purposes, was completed, which became experimental only because its 40-horsepower gasoline engine did not prove strong enough. The steam-powered Stoltz engine was rather installed in railroad cars, with considerable success. By 1904, in addition to Ganz steam engines, Stoltz cars appeared on the railways. These vehicles were manufactured until 1909, until orders ran out. According to the state industry subsidy of 1910, only Hungarian produced cars were allowed as taxi cars in Hungary. Thus, the Wagon Factory makes its three-seater rental car. There is even a light truck from this period. However, the relationship with Daimler did not prove fruitful, so the parties terminated it in 1911 by mutual agreement. Production begins in the steel foundry, which was replaced in 1914 by a Siemens-Martin furnace.

In 1913, the Czech Praha car license was purchased, on the basis of which the production of RÁBA "V" type trucks and RÁBA Grand passenger cars began. The steward's office ordered a special RÁBA Grand for the personal use of Emperor Charles I of Austria. In 1904, the production of the first petrol engine powered trucks started.

Technical solutions for the production of railway carriages

In 1899, the Rába had started to export to foreign countries: it supplied railway passenger carriages to Egypt, the East Indies, Southern Africa, city tramcars to Amsterdam and Antwerp. In the first decade of the 20th century, the factory upgraded its fleet and built a new wagon assembly hall. Metals are gaining ground: in 1905, wagons were already reinforced with iron. Due to the special requirements of export orders, the factory has to provide state-of-the-art technology. Domestic customers mainly require steam heating and oil lighting, while foreigners require electric lighting. For the 1906 exhibition in Milan, the company enters with sophisticated railroad cars, where little has been sacrificed for everything for comfort. The "International Sleeping Car Company" ordered a dining car was one of the most honorable tasks. The successful completion of the high-demand, high-demand trial order resulted in the ordering of an additional 14 dining cars by the  Wagons-Lits company.
The waggon company produced city tram cars for Temesvár (Now Timisoara), Kassa (now Košice), Nagyvárad (now Oradea), Szeged and for the Budapest suburban railways too. The carriages of the London underground railway were constructed and manufactured in the Rába company. In 1905, the London Underground Railway ordered 30 multiple-unit trains, 66 passenger cars for multiple-unit trains and bogies.

Interwar period

In 1922, according to the plans of Vilmos Szilágyi, a special armored car was built, then a civilian car. The direction of travel of the vehicle was reversible by means of a reverser, it was steerable on both sides and could be operated in four gears in both directions.

In 1923, a RÁBA car took second place on the Hungarian tour of Austria. To order the post office, the production of a "P" type 1.5-ton truck was started, a modified version of which was also used as a fire truck.

In 1925, another license agreement was concluded with the Praha factory. Based on this, three-ton trucks and buses marked "L" were built.

From 1926 to 1929, "Pe" electric cars were manufactured for the post office in cooperation with the Ganz factory, which supplied the engines, and the Tudor factory, which supplied the batteries.

In 1927, the factory purchased a license from Krupp Works to produce 3- and 5-ton trucks powered by four- and six-cylinder engines.

In 1928, instead of the obsolete design vans, they bought the right to manufacture modern "AF" cars designed by Austro-Fiat, which were manufactured until 1934.

In 1936, the RÁBA Super 2.5 ton trucks and then the RÁBA Special 3.5 ton trucks were built, which were built with the help of the AFI cooperation. These cars were made with a 5-speed transmission and, for the first time, a welded steel chassis. By 1951, 2,500 pieces had been made from this successful construction.

An aircraft workshop has been organized, so far only to make better use of the car factory’s fleet. The technology is expanding with aluminum foundry and non-ferrous metal production. Deep drawing was used to make the aircraft kite.

In 1937, he bought a license from the German manufacturer MAN to manufacture the RÁBA diesel engine. The Super cars are equipped with 65 hp, the Specials with 80 hp engines, the 100 hp engine is installed in the RÁBA-MAN D5 truck and in the 50-person Tram-bus manufactured from 1940.

In 1938, construction of the aircraft engine workshop began. A test room with brake pads will be built to test the engines. In his March speech, Kálmán Darányi announced the famous Győr program, which financed 1 billion pengos primarily for military industrial development.

In 1939, based on the Győr program, the 38M Botond military SUV was completed under the direction of Dezső Winkler, based on the further development of the previously successful RÁBA-AFI family. Five more Hungarian companies join the production, the first 150 pieces are delivered on July 1, 1939, followed by another 1252 until June 30, 1940.

The steel plant will be supplemented with heat treatment equipment suitable for the production of armor plates, and the old hydraulic presses will be replaced. In addition to investments in direct military production, wagon production will also be developed, new workshops will be built for the car plant and these will be equipped with modern machinery.

The RÁBA-MAN RÁBA 41 M artillery tractor, powered by a 100-horsepower six-cylinder engine, is being built, and Botond's experience has already been used in its design.

World War II
In 1940, independent aircraft production also began, after the assembly hall and parts warehouse were built. The first such construction is the prototype of the Levente school aircraft [1]. This year, 27 more WM-21 Falcon double-deck melee and bombing aircraft and 29 Focke-Wulf Fw 58 Weihe [2] military training aircraft will be produced.

Production of Messerschmitt aircraft begins in 1942: the Bf 109 single piston engine fighter and the Me 210 twin-engine fighter bomber.

The devastation of war

Most of the capacity expansion carried out during the boom was destroyed by the bombings. After the German occupation, 18 major and 8 minor bombings hit the city. The first and most destructive was the April 13, 1944, which lasted only 20 minutes, but during that time 385 bombs weighing 227 kg, 500 bombs weighing 45.5 kg, 2,000 bombs weighing 20 kg, and 30-40 a thousand 3 kg incendiary bombs were dropped by the American Liberators. The number of victims exceeded 1,000. The Wagon Factory, the Airport, the Distillery, the Gas Factory, the Cardo Furniture Factory, the MÁV Machine Factory (MÁVAG), the National Electricity Co. (OVIRT), the railway station and the rails. Of the city’s 16 bridges, 15 were blown up, trees were cleared from the city’s parks due to lack of coal, and water, gas and electricity were cut off. Győr was rightly apostrophized by the contemporary authors as a ruined city.

Post World War II and communist era

1945. on March 28, the factory came under Soviet military command. In the first years after the war, reparations accounted for much of the factory’s production.

1947: A prototype of a 45-ton steam crane is made, from which production begins in 1948.

1948: Launch of a new product: Bleichert electric forklifts. Forklift manufacturing takes the place of agricultural machinery manufacturing, which will be phased out. Between 1947 and 1949, the bridge factory manufactured the steel structures of the Árpád Bridge in Budapest, the Tisza Bridge in Vásárosnamény and the Révfalus Bridge in Győr.

1949: Design and manufacture of a new two-ton forklift (type V27). The state-of-the-art steel foundry of the country with a capacity of 4-500 tons will be built in the factory. Independent car production will be discontinued for profile cleaning. The design of the cars is transferred to JÁFI under the leadership of director Dezső Winkler, who in 1951 received the Kossuth Prize for his previous work. With the reorganization of car production, bus production will be moved to Ikarus, the running, ready-to-assemble truck chassis will be moved to the Csepel Car Factory, and the production of chassis, steering gear and gearbox will remain in Győr for the time being.

1951: The first 20,000 m 3 ball tank is completed for the Győr gas plant. The bridge plant manufactures steel structures for various large investments: plate chimneys and gantry cranes for Dunai Vasmű, tanks for Szőny, and various iron structures for the Szolnok sulfuric acid plant. An outstanding product is the rotating bridge made for Egypt.

1953: The double-decker railway bridge over the Danube connecting Romania and Bulgaria is completed. The factory is making an aluminum bridge for free accommodation. It is the second aluminum bridge in Europe and the fourth in the world. Due to the immature technology, the road bridge was made with riveting.

1954: As part of the national railway diesel diesel program, the Győr plant receives the production and development of one of the bore families of Ganz-Jendrassik engines. The factory workers play a significant role in the fight against the floods in the islands.

1955: The Heluan road and rail bridge is completed for Egypt. State-of-the-art new manufacturing technologies are introduced in the fields of welding, heat treatment and painting.

1956. on October 27, the Workers' Council is formed and takes over the management of the factory for a short time.

In 1957, the members of the Pattantyús brigade: János Bors, Jenő Kapuváry, Lajos Maróti, Sándor Pécsi and Sándor Rátz received the Kossuth Prize for the innovative heat treatment process introduced in the production of the crankshaft of Ganz-Jendrassik engines.

In 1963, following a government decision, a license was purchased for the production of diesel engines, which will be the engine of Hungarian buses and trucks in the coming years. The production of undercarriages will be multiplied and modernized. Big investments are starting.

The first results of the technological development are completed in 1967: Ikarus presents the first copies of the 200 bus family on the BNV, for which the rear axle and the MAN-licensed engine are provided by RÁBA.

The new engine factory was inaugurated in 1969 (the old engine factory has since become a maintenance workshop). Production of tractors for the 16-tonne RÁBA truck and 22-tonne 3-axle trailers begins.

In 1973, a license was purchased from the American manufacturer Steiger for the production of heavy agricultural tractors, to which other agricultural machines connected to it were also made. The 10,000th chassis is completed.

Since 1974, the factory has been exporting more and more rear axles, including to the United States, where Steiger has close ties with the tractor factory.

1980 DAF 241 cabs appear on trucks. Rába's trucks originally used cabins supplied by West German MAN, but from 1980 on DAF's F241 cabin was used. A few Roman cabs (of MAN origins) were also supplied from Romania in return for engines.

In the eighties, the development of the Rába H-series military car family began. Initially, they are fitted with Kamaz, later DAF cabs. Their mass-produced models have been made for the army since 2003. In the 1980s, Rába built no more than about 2,000 trucks per year, although it was Hungary's third biggest employer. Being an important provider to Hungarocamion, a publicly operated international trucking firm, helped raise their international profile. In 1985, Rába's business mostly consisted of engine and axle manufacturing, with only 15% of turnover being represented by trucks. Of these trucks, however, nearly 90 per cent were exported, with the lion's share going to Yugoslavia. In 1986, Rába introduced a more powerful,  diesel engine (D11TLL) in order to help their trucks compete internationally and to meet Hungarocamion's needs. The new engine range was loosely based on the earlier MAN units, but were now of 11.05 litres, and were developed together with the Linz Institute of Graz, Austria.

After the fall of communism

In 1992, the factory was transformed into a joint-stock company again. In 1997, as one of the steps in the implementation of the privatization strategy, the shares of Rába Rt. Will be listed on the Budapest Stock Exchange.

In 1993, new truck types with MAN F90 cabs appeared.

In 1998, they switched to DAF cabs again. The Rába FA27 all-wheel drive forestry car and the SL18 tractor are displayed.

In 1999, Rába Rt. Organized most of its activities into external companies and transformed into a holding company.

In 2001, the uneconomical engine plant was sold and bus production ceased.

In 2003, the production of special cars for the army begins. 

The Rába Automotive Holding Plc. Operates in three business areas, which is three ltd. and whose contribution to the company's turnover is as follows (2016 data):

 Rába Futómű Kft. 49%
 Rába Járműipari Alkatrészgyártó Kft. 27%
 Rába Jármű Kft. 24%

The chassis business

It continues to manufacture rear axles for heavy vehicles: trucks, buses, special vehicles and tractors. The products are self-developed and designed undercarriages, and Rába's products occupy one of the most important places in world production in this field.
Automotive Parts Business

The factory mainly undertakes the supply of car seats for domestic and foreign car factories and railway cars. The sites are not located in Győr, but in the countryside.
Vehicle business

Ltd. capacity and production structure:

    production of spare parts for 500 truck chassis per year
    production of plate parts required for 150 bus chassis per year
    production of 150 superstructures per year
    1000 units per year - welded iron structural element
    plate parts for the Rába group 15000 hours / year

Self-developed cars:

    Development of type H14 - Euro3
    Development of type H18 - Euro3
    Development of type H25 - Euro3
    E95 military bus chassis - Euro3
    E13 / E91 / S91 midibus chassis - Euro4
    Development of H25.324 - Euro4

Controversy
During the 2022 Russian invasion of Ukraine, Rába refused to join the international community and withdraw from the Russian market. Research from Yale University updated on April 28, 2022 identifying how companies were reacting to Russia's invasion identified Rába in the worst category of "Digging In", meaning Defying Demands for Exit: companies defying demands for exit/reduction of activities.

References

External links

Official page

Motor vehicle manufacturers of Austria-Hungary
Automotive companies of Hungary
Truck manufacturers of Hungary
Vehicle manufacturing companies established in 1896
1896 establishments in Hungary
1896 establishments in Austria-Hungary
Hungarian brands
Győr